Richard Assheton (by 1529 – 1579), of Whalley and Downham, Lancashire, was an English politician.

He was a Member (MP) of the Parliament of England for Aldborough in 1559 and for Carlisle in 1558 and 1563.

References

1579 deaths
Politicians from Lancashire
English MPs 1558
English MPs 1559
English MPs 1563–1567
Year of birth uncertain
People from Lancashire (before 1974)